Khanfar, Hadhramaut is a village in eastern Yemen. It is located in the Hadhramaut Governorate. Historically, Khanfar mined potassium nitrate, which was processed into gunpowder.

References

External links
Towns and villages in the Hadhramaut Governorate

Populated places in Hadhramaut Governorate